The Hammer was an Australian automobile built in Mount Torrens, South Australia in 1900 by bicycle mechanic and blacksmith Bruno Hammer. Hammer had never seen an automobile when he was asked to build one. He used imported drawings and built the entire vehicle himself, including the chassis, wheels, engine and carburetor. It was locally known as the "Tung-tung", due to the sound of its exhaust.

It is said to have survived until The Great War, when it was destroyed by a bush fire.

References

Vintage vehicles
Cars of Australia